Dave Hume-Brown is a Jamaican Labour Party politician who has been Member of Parliament for Hanover Eastern since 2016. He attended Cornwall College.

References 

Living people
21st-century Jamaican politicians
Members of the House of Representatives of Jamaica
Jamaica Labour Party politicians
People from Hanover Parish
Year of birth missing (living people)
Members of the 13th Parliament of Jamaica
Members of the 14th Parliament of Jamaica